Darkness is a horror novel by John Saul published in 1991. Set in the fictional hamlet of Villejeune, Florida, a town shrouded by a dark, evil force. On the edge of an eerie swamp the townsfolk act out gruesome rituals to appease the dark spirit that lies within the watery fortress enveloping the village. The Andersons return to the town, and soon realize they must confront this evil head on.

References

Supernatural fiction
American horror novels
1991 American novels
Bantam Books books